Drug detoxification (informally, detox)  is variously the intervention in a case of physical dependence to a drug; the process and experience of a withdrawal syndrome; and any of various treatments for acute drug overdose.

A detoxification program for physical dependence does not necessarily address the precedents of addiction, social factors, psychological addiction, or the often-complex behavioral issues that intermingle with addiction.

Process
The United States Department of Health and Human Services acknowledges three steps in a drug detoxification process:

Evaluation: Upon beginning drug detoxification, a patient is first tested to see which specific substances are presently circulating in their bloodstream and the amount. Clinicians also evaluate the patient for potential co-occurring disorders, dual diagnosis, and mental/behavioral issues.
Stabilization: In this stage, the patient is guided through the process of detoxification. This may be done with or without the use of medications but for the most part the former is more common. Also part of stabilization is explaining to the patient what to expect during treatment and the recovery process. Where appropriate, people close to the addict are brought in at this time to become involved and show support.
Guiding Patient into Treatment: The last step of the detoxification process is to ready the patient for the actual recovery process. As drug detoxification only deals with the physical dependency and addiction to drugs, it does not address the psychological aspects of drug addiction. This stage entails obtaining agreement from the patient to complete the process by enrolling in a drug rehabilitation program.

Rapid detoxification
The principle of rapid detoxification is to use heavy sedation alongside dosing with opioid antagonists. This approach is expensive, ineffective and extremely dangerous. Rapid detox and ultra-rapid detox are non-standard medical detoxification protocols that have been investigated for their role in managing opioid withdrawal.

Etymology
The concept of "detoxification" comes from the discredited autotoxin theory of George E. Pettey and others.  David F. Musto says that "according to Pettey, opiates stimulated the production of toxins in the intestines, which had the physiological effect associated with withdrawal phenomena. [...] Therefore treatment would consist of purging the body of toxins and any lurking morphine that might remain to stimulate toxin production in the future."

Rapid detox controversy
Naltrexone therapy, which critics claim lacks long-term efficacy and can actually be detrimental to a patient's long-term recovery, has led to controversy. Additionally, there have been many questions raised about the ethics as well as safety of rapid detox following a number of deaths resulting from the procedure.

Some researchers say that relapses to injection use of illicit opioids during or following repeated detoxification episodes carry the substantial potential for injury associated with uncontrolled drug use and include drug overdose, infections, and death.

See also
Alcohol detoxification

References

Drugs
Drug rehabilitation
Substance dependence
Detoxification

pl:Detoks